The Air Command Commander  Side-By-Side is an American autogyro designed and produced by Air Command International of Caddo Mills, Texas.  The aircraft is supplied as a kit for amateur construction.

Design and development
The Commander Side-By-Side provides an unusual gyroplane design in that it has side-by-side configuration seating. The gyroplane was designed to comply with the US Experimental - Amateur-built rules. It features a single main rotor, a two-seat open cockpit without a windshield, tricycle landing gear and a four-cylinder, air-cooled, four-stroke,  Subaru EJ22 automotive conversion engine in pusher configuration driving the propeller though a Gilmer belt reduction drive.

Optional equipment available includes a folding mast, hydraulic wheel brakes and an electric trim system.

Specifications (Commander Side-By-Side)

See also
List of rotorcraft

References

External links

Photo of the Air Command Commander Side-By-Side

Commander Side-By-Side
1990s United States sport aircraft
Homebuilt aircraft
Single-engined pusher autogyros